Thomas Stoltz Harvey (October 10, 1912 – April 5, 2007) was an American pathologist who conducted the autopsy on Albert Einstein in 1955. Harvey afterwards kept Einstein's brain without permission for decades.

Early career

Harvey studied at Yale University as an undergraduate and later as a medical student under Dr. Harry Zimmerman.  In his third year of medical school he contracted tuberculosis and was bedridden for the next year in a sanatorium, claiming it to be one of the biggest disappointments of his life.

Autopsy of Albert Einstein
The autopsy was conducted at Princeton Hospital, Princeton NJ, on April 18 at 8:00 am. Einstein's brain weighed 1,230 grams - well within the normal human range.  Dr. Harvey sectioned the preserved brain into 170 pieces in a lab at the University of Pennsylvania, a process that took three full months to complete.  Those 170 sections were then sliced in microscopic slivers and mounted onto slides and stained.  There were 12 sets of slides created with hundreds of slides in each set.  Harvey retained two complete sets for his own research and distributed the rest to handpicked leading pathologists of the time. No permission for the removal and preservation had been given by Einstein or his family, but when the family learned about the study, permission to proceed with the study was granted as long as the results were only published in scientific journals and not sensationalised.

Theft of Einstein's brain

In August, 1978, New Jersey Monthly reporter Steven Levy published an article, "I Found Einstein's Brain", based on his interview with Harvey when Harvey was working in Wichita, Kansas. In 1988, Harvey retired and moved to Lawrence, Kansas. In 1996, Harvey moved from Weston, Missouri to Titusville in Hopewell Township, Mercer County, New Jersey. In the 1994 documentary Relics: Einstein's Brain, Kinki University Professor Sugimoto Kenji asks Harvey for a piece of the brain, to which Harvey consents and slices a portion of the brain-stem. Footage shows Harvey segmenting and handing over to Sugimoto a portion. In 1998, Harvey delivered the remaining uncut portion of Einstein's brain to Dr. Elliot Krauss, a pathologist at University Medical Center at Princeton. As Marian Diamond and associates discovered, certain parts of Einstein's brain were found to have a higher proportion of glial cells than the average male brain.

In 2005, on the occasion of the 50th anniversary of Einstein's death, the 92-year-old Harvey gave interviews regarding the history of the brain from his home in New Jersey.

Harvey died at the University Medical Center at Princeton on April 5, 2007, of complications of a stroke.

Legacy
In 2010, Harvey's heirs transferred all of his holdings constituting the remains of Albert Einstein's brain to the National Museum of Health and Medicine, including 14 photographs of the whole brain (which is now in fragments) never before revealed to the public.

Cultural references
The story of Harvey's theft of Einstein's brain, and its subsequent study, was explained in an episode of the Science Channel show Dark Matters: Twisted But True, a series which explores the darker side of scientific discovery and experimentation, which premiered on September 7, 2011. The program segment "The Secrets of Einstein's Brain" re-aired on the History Channel on June 4, 2016.

References

Further reading
Michael Paterniti, Driving Mr. Albert: A Trip Across America With Einstein's Brain (G K Hall & Co, December, 2000)
Carolyn Abraham, Possessing Genius: The Bizarre Odyssey of Einstein's Brain (St Martins Press, March, 2002)

External links
Newspaper Obituary for Dr. Thomas Stoltz Harvey Died April 5, 2007
Doctor kept Einstein's brain in jar 43 years
The Whereabouts of Dr. Einstein's Brain
Neuroscience for Kids - Einstein's Brain
NY Times

1912 births
2007 deaths
American pathologists
People from Wichita, Kansas
People from Lawrence, Kansas
People from Weston, Missouri
People from Hopewell Township, Mercer County, New Jersey
Physicians from Louisville, Kentucky